Patricia "Patti" Blevins is an American politician and the former President pro tempore of the Delaware Senate. A Democrat, she represented the 7th district from 1990 until 2016, when she lost her reelection campaign by 282 votes. Blevins served as Majority Leader of the Delaware Senate from 2009 to 2012 and Majority Whip from 2007 to 2009. She was on the town council and mayor of Elsmere, Delaware from 1985 to 1990. She attended Mount Pleasant High School and received her BA in psychology from Temple University in 1975.

References

External links

1954 births
Delaware city council members
Mayors of places in Delaware
Democratic Party Delaware state senators
Living people
People from Wilmington, Delaware
Temple University alumni
Women state legislators in Delaware
21st-century American politicians
21st-century American women politicians
Women city councillors in Delaware